Christian Sarramagna (born 29 December 1951) is a French football manager and former player. He is currently managing CS Hammam-Lif in the Tunisian Ligue Professionnelle 1.

Titles

As a player
French championship in 1974, 1975, 1976 with AS Saint-Étienne
Coupe de France 1974, 1975, and 1977 with AS Saint-Étienne
UEFA Champions League runner-up in  1976 with AS Saint-Étienne

External links
 
 
 

1951 births
Living people
French footballers
France international footballers
Association football forwards
French football managers
Ligue 1 players
Ligue 2 players
AS Saint-Étienne players
Montpellier HSC players
Footballers from the Basque Country (autonomous community)
French-Basque people
AS Saint-Étienne managers
FC Martigues managers
CS Sedan Ardennes managers
FC Mulhouse managers
FC Sète 34 managers
LB Châteauroux managers
Expatriate football managers in Tunisia